Johannes de Stokem (or Johannes Stokem, last name also Prato, Pratis, Stockem, Stokhem, Stoken, Stoccken, Stoecken, Sthoken;  1445 – 1487 or 1501), was a Flemish composer of the Renaissance. He is considered to be part of the post-Dufay generation in France. He was a friend of Johannes Tinctoris, another composer of the period.

Life
Stokem was born in 1445, probably in Stokkem near Liège. For parts of his life, he served under Beatrice of Aragon, the Queen of Hungary, and as part of the Papal Choir in Rome. He died in either 1487 or 1501.

Music and influence
His piece, Brunette, was published in the Odhecaton and is an early example of a genre of music commonly known as "little brown-eyed girl." It is one of the few five-voice works found in the Odhecaton.

Works
 Brunette, from the Odhecaton
 Harraytre Amours, recently arraigned into a string trio.
 Le suis d'Alemagne (4 voices)
 Ave Maria Maris Stella (2 voices)

References

1440s births
Year of death uncertain
Belgian classical composers
Belgian male classical composers
Flemish composers
Renaissance composers
Musicians from Liège